Netball was one of the ten core sports at the 2018 Commonwealth Games, which was held on the Gold Coast in Australia. This was the sixth staging of netball at the Commonwealth Games since its inclusion in 1998, and the second time the netball event was held in Australia.

The competition took place between 5 and 15 April 2018. Preliminary matches were held at the Gold Coast Convention and Exhibition Centre, with finals matches held at the Coomera Indoor Sports Centre. A total of 144 athletes from 12 nations participated in the tournament.

Schedule
The following is the competition schedule for the netball competition:

Venues

All matches for the netball event were held in the host city.

Preliminary matches were played at the Gold Coast Convention and Exhibition Centre, which has a seating capacity of 5,000. The venue also hosted basketball matches and was the Main Media Centre for the Games.

Finals matches were played at the Coomera Indoor Sports Centre, which opened in 2016 and has a seating capacity of 7,500. It also hosted some gymnastics events for the Games.

Qualification
Twelve nations competed in the netball competition at the 2018 Commonwealth Games:
 Australia qualified as the host nation for the Games;
 The remaining 11 nations comprised the 11 highest-ranked teams in the INF World Rankings (excluding the host nation) as at 1 July 2017, with at least three Commonwealth Games Federation regions (Africa, Americas, Asia, Caribbean, Europe and Oceania) being represented. The teams were officially confirmed on July 25, 2017.

Rosters

There were 12 participating nations at the netball competitions with a total of 144 athletes, up to 12 per team. The number of athletes a nation entered is in parentheses beside the name of the country.

Preliminary round

Pool A

Pool B

Classification matches

Eleventh place match

Ninth place match

Seventh place match

Fifth place match

Medal round

Semi-finals

Bronze medal match

Gold medal match

Final standings

Medallists

References

External links
 Official website: 2018 Commonwealth Games – Netball
 Results Book – Netball

 
2018
netball
2018 in netball
International netball competitions hosted by Australia
Common
Netball in Queensland